The New England Adolescent Research Institute (NEARI) is a therapeutic educational organization operating in Holyoke, Massachusetts.  It was founded in 1984 by Steven Bengis and Penny Cuninggim to treat extremely challenged youth with learning disabilities, mental illness, and/or neurological disorders.  NEARI operates Chapter 766 special education day schools for high school, middle school, and older elementary school students.  Additionally, NEARI operates a training institute and a publishing company

The publishing company has published works ranging from manuals for specialists in the field of sexual assault to survivor stories. All works are selected for publication based on their ability to educate the public.

Educational philosophy 
The NEARI day schools practice a "relationship-based" model of learning.  This model is a set of policies and principles that guide staff to form lasting relationships with their students.  Most of the details of this model are proprietary and can not be disclosed here.  One publicly acknowledged piece of this model is a low student-to-staff ratio.  NEARI operates on a ratio of about 3:1 or 2:1, depending on the program in question.  The drawback to this approach is the substantial financial load it places on the organization.

Brain-based treatment and education 
Since the year 2000, NEARI has been incorporating "brain-based" technology into its educational and therapeutic services.  Coordinated by Penny Cuninggim, this initiative combines specialized exercise with an awareness of learning styles and new practices for diagnosing and treating visual and auditory processing issues.

Facilities

Current facilities 
The NEARI day schools currently operate out of two buildings leased from the Immaculate Conception parish, which used to operate a parochial school out of the buildings. The buildings have a computer-to-student ratio of 1:2 or better in all classrooms, all of which are Apple iMacs or newer. The structures' electrical system is outdated, however, which results in frequent tripping of circuit breakers. The school buildings do not have commercial kitchen facilities, so student meals are delivered daily by the Holyoke School Department. The facilities also have poor insulation and aging HVAC systems, causing higher energy costs.

Future facilities 
NEARI is in the process of constructing a new, state-of-the-art school, clinic, and training facility on Old Easthampton Road, near Route 141 in northern Holyoke.  This facility is being planned as an environmentally-safe, energy efficient green building.  This new structure is supposed to correct the wasted-space issue as well as providing modern kitchen, HVAC, and vocational services.  The project is working closely with regulators to avoid harming any endangered species native to the Holyoke Range, such as the Marbled Salamander.  The total cost of this project is currently estimated at over six million dollars.

External links 
 New England Adolescent Research Institute (NEARI)

1984 establishments in Massachusetts
Buildings and structures in Holyoke, Massachusetts
Educational institutions established in 1984
Organizations based in Holyoke, Massachusetts
Special schools in the United States
Schools in Hampden County, Massachusetts